The men's team cross country event was part of the track and field athletics programme at the 1924 Summer Olympics. It was the third and last appearance of this event. The competition was held on Saturday, July 12, 1924.  

Six nations competed as they have at least three competitors participating in the individual cross country race.

Results
The first three runners for each nation to finish in the individual cross country race counted towards the team results. The placings and points were only given to the first three runners of the teams that had already three finishers. Their placings were summed, and the team with the lowest sum won.

References
Olympic Report
sports-reference
 

Men's cross country team
1924